Mary Elizabeth Brown (1862 – 1 May 1952) was one of the first women graduates of the University of Sydney (1885).

Early life
Mary Elizabeth Brown was born in Samoa in 1862. Her father, the Reverend Doctor George Brown, was a Methodist missionary and moved to Samoa in 1860. Reverend Brown was also a collector of artifacts, whose collection is exhibited in part at the National Museum of Ethnology, Osaka, Japan. Elizabeth, the second of seven children, was born and lived her early years in Samoa, until she was sent, together with her eldest sister Amy, to her grandparents in Auckland, New Zealand, for her education. Brown became one of the first pupils at the Auckland Girls' High School which opened in 1877. The Browns moved to Sydney in January 1881, having established about twenty-nine missionary stations. Brown entered as a pupil at a ladies' college, the Argyle School, in Albion Street, Surry Hills.

Years at the University of Sydney
1882 was the first year in which female students were admitted to the University of Sydney. In June 1882 Brown passed the matriculation exam for the University of Sydney (1 of 74 admitted that year), and was admitted to studying Classics, Mathematics (Class I) and Natural Science (Class II), and was awarded the Walker Bursary No 4.  Despite her significant family responsibilities, she successfully completed her studies at the university, and passed the examination for the Bachelor of Arts degree in 1885. Brown was often at the top of her class in Classics, Mathematics, Natural Science, and Chemistry.

Career
Not much is known about Brown's personal life, except that she never married,  nor about her teaching career. In April 1885 she became a teacher in the Brisbane Girls Grammar School. During the annual speech day held at the Grammar School in 1897, the Headmistress made reference to 'a very successful dancing class held by Miss Brown during the second and third quarters' of that year'. When her sister Amy died in 1904, leaving seven children, the youngest only one week old, Elizabeth helped her mother care for the children. In 1908, when her father returned to his hometown of Durham in England, Elizabeth and one of her sisters followed him, and helped with the writing of his autobiography 'George Brown DD, Pioneer-Missionary and Explorer: An Autobiography'.  Brown died in Sydney on 1 May 1952, aged 90.

The Brown Fellowship at the University of Sydney
The Equity fellowships were introduced by the university in 2009. The Brown Fellowship is one of these, named after Mary Elizabeth Brown. The aim of the Brown Fellowships is to assist university researchers, both male and female, whose careers have been interrupted by the undertaking of sustained primary caring duties. The Brown fellowship provides substantial relief from teaching and administrative responsibilities and allows Fellows to focus on their research while re-establishing or enhancing their academic research careers.

References

1862 births
1952 deaths
University of Sydney alumni
People from Auckland
Australian schoolteachers
Samoan emigrants to Australia